Martius yellow is an organic compound that once was used to protect wool from moths.  It is prepared by nitration of naphthol.

Martius yellow stains have been used to stain erythrocytes yellow so that they contrast well with red fibrin in trichrome staining methods such as Lendrum's Picro Mallory and Slidder's Martius, Scarlet and Blue (MSB). It can be combined with other small molecular weight yellow dyes to increase stain intensity.

References

1-Naphthols
Nitronaphthalenes
Dyes